La Llanera Vengadora (The Avenging Plainswoman) is a Mexican comic book series published by Ediciones Latinoamericanas. The main character, Flor Silvestre "La Llanera Vengadora", was based on and portrayed by the Mexican singer and actress Flor Silvestre.

References

External links
 La Llanera Vengadora Issue #30

Mexican comics titles